All World 2 is the second greatest hits compilation from hip hop artist LL Cool J released on December 8, 2009, by Def Jam.

Reception

AllMusic's review derided the album for replicating too much material from All World: Greatest Hits while leaving out too much to be a decent entry point for LL Cool J's work, wryly declaring the release "an acceptable starting point if you don’t feel the need to own classics like “I Need a Beat,” “I’m Bad,” “Going Back to Cali,” “The Boomin’ System,” and “Mama Said Knock You Out.”"

Track listing

References

2009 greatest hits albums
LL Cool J albums
Albums produced by DJ Scratch
Albums produced by Marley Marl
Albums produced by Rick Rubin
Albums produced by Timbaland
Albums produced by Tricky Stewart
Albums produced by the Neptunes
Def Jam Recordings compilation albums
Hip hop compilation albums